Trachyderes distinctus is a species of beetle in the family Cerambycidae. It was described by Bosq in 1951.

References

Trachyderini
Beetles described in 1951